Puerto Páez Airport  is an airport serving the border town of Puerto Páez in the Apure state of Venezuela. It has two parallel runways: a grass runway with standard basic markings, and a longer dirt runway partially overgrown with brush.

See also
Transport in Venezuela
List of airports in Venezuela

References

External links
OurAirports - Puerto Páez

Airports in Venezuela